Charles Fremont Cochran (September 27, 1846 – December 19, 1906) was a U.S. Representative from Missouri.

Born in Kirksville, Missouri, Cochran moved to Atchison, Kansas, in 1860.
He attended public and private schools.
Apprenticed to the printer's trade.
He was editor and publisher of the Atchison Patriot in 1868 and 1869.
He studied law.
He was admitted to the bar in 1873 and practiced until 1885.
He served as prosecuting attorney of Atchison County, Kansas from 1880 to 1884.
He returned to Missouri in 1885 and settled in St. Joseph.
He engaged in the newspaper business and edited the St. Joseph Gazette in St. Joseph, Missouri.
He served in the State senate in 1890–1894.

Cochran was elected as a Democrat to the Fifty-fifth and to the three succeeding Congresses (March 4, 1897 – March 3, 1905).
He was a contestant for renomination in 1904 but finally withdrew as a candidate.
Founded the Observer, a weekly newspaper, of which he served as editor until his death in St. Joseph, Missouri, on December 19, 1906.
He was interred in Mount Mora Cemetery, St. Joseph, Missouri.

References

1846 births
1906 deaths
People from Atchison, Kansas
Democratic Party Missouri state senators
Democratic Party members of the United States House of Representatives from Missouri
19th-century American politicians